A gingival disease is the term given to any disorder primarily affecting the gingiva.

An example is gingivitis.

Causes
Dental plaque accumulates at the surfaces when proper cleaning and maintaining is not done. There is inflammation due to the bacteria released from the toxins. calculus forms and if not removed, causes this disease.

References

External links 

Periodontal disorders